The Mating is a 1918 American silent comedy-drama film directed by Frederick A. Thomson and starring Gladys Leslie, Herbert Rawlinson, Forrest Robinson, John Thomson, and Aida Horton. The film was released by Vitagraph Company of America on October 7, 1918.

Plot

Cast
Gladys Leslie as Nancy Fanne
Herbert Rawlinson as Dick Ives
Forrest Robinson as Mr. Fane
John Thomson as Bob
Aida Horton as Betty
Stephen Carr as Billy
Frances Miller as Mammy

Preservation
The film is now considered lost.

References

External links

1918 comedy-drama films
1910s English-language films
1918 films
American silent feature films
American black-and-white films
Vitagraph Studios films
1918 lost films
Lost American films
Lost comedy-drama films
Films directed by Frederick A. Thomson
1910s American films
Silent American comedy-drama films